Israel national water polo team may refer to:

 Israel men's national water polo team
 Israel women's national water polo team